Larnaca is a city on the south east coast of Cyprus and the capital of the district of the same name. It is the third-largest city in the country, after Nicosia and Limassol, with a metro population of 144,200 in 2015.

Larnaca is known for its palm-tree seafront also called Finikoudes (Greek: Φινικούδες) as well as the Church of Saint Lazarus, Hala Sultan Tekke, Kamares Aqueduct, and Larnaca Castle. It is built on the ruins of ancient Citium, which was the birthplace of Stoic philosopher Zeno. Larnaca is home to the country's primary airport, Larnaca International Airport. It also has a seaport and a marina.

Names
The name Larnaca originates from the Ancient Greek noun   'coffer, box; chest, e.g. for household stores; cinerary urn, sarcophagus, coffin; drinking trough, chalice'. An informal etymology attributes the origin of the name to the many larnakes (sarcophagi) that have been found in the area. Sophocles Hadjisavvas, a state archeologist, states that "[the city's U.S.] consul of the last quarter of the 19th century, claimed to have explored more than 3,000 tombs in the area of Larnaca, so-called after the immense number of sarcophagi found in the modern town".

In the vernacular, Larnaca is also known as Scala (  from the word , a loanword from the Italian , meaning "ladder" or "landing stage") referring to the historical port.

During the Middle Ages, until the end of the 18th century, a small port-anchorage close to Larnaca Bay is referred to on maps, engravings, in travel descriptions and documents as 'Scala di Saline and may account for this second name; other names that appear on maps include: Porto delle Salines, Rada delle Saline,  Ponta delle Saline, Punta delle Salino, Golfo delle Saline, Port Salines, Selines, Salines, Le Seline, Le Salline, Saline, Salin, Salinas, Arnicho di Salinas, Port of Lazarus, Lazare [o], Marine, Marina, and Commercio [customs].

History

The former city-kingdom of Kition was originally established in the 13th century BC. New cultural elements appearing between 1200 BC and 1000 BC (personal objects, pottery, new architectural forms and ideas) are interpreted as indications of significant political changes and the arrival of the Achaeans, the first Greek colonists of Kition. Around the same time, Phoenicians settled the area.

At the archaeological sites of Kiteon, remains that date from the 13th century BC have been found. Around 1000 BC, Kition was rebuilt by Phoenicians and it subsequently became a center of Phoenician culture. The remains of the sites include cyclopean walls and a complex of five temples and a naval port.

It was conquered in the first millennium BC by a series of great powers of the region. First by the Assyrian Empire, then by Egypt. Like most Cypriot cities, Kition belonged to the Persian or Achaemenid Empire. In 450 BC, the Athenian general Cimon died at sea, while militarily supporting the revolt against Persia's rule over Cyprus. On his deathbed, he urged his officers to conceal his death from both their allies and the Persians.

Strong earthquakes hit the city in 76 AD and the year after.

Earthquakes of 322 AD and 342 "caused the destruction not only of Kition but also of Salamis and Pafos". Kition's harbor silted up, and the population moved to the seafront farther south, sometime after this. (Contributing factors to the silting are thought to have been earthquakes, deforestation and overgrazing.)

The commercial port was located at Skala, during the Ottoman Period starting in 1571. Skala is the name of the seashore immediately south of the Larnaca castle—and its neighborhood.

Geography
The Salt Lake fills with water during the winter season and is visited by flocks of flamingoes who stay there from November until the end of March. It usually dries up in the summer. In the past, it yielded good quality salt scraped from the dried surface. The salt from the lake is now considered unsuitable for consumption.

Climate
The climate in this area is described by the Köppen Climate Classification System as a hot semi-arid climate (BSh) due to its low annual rainfall and hot summer temperatures resulting in highly negative water balance. It is sometimes described as a mediterranean climate due to the pronounced rainy season in winter and virtually rainless summers, but this winter rainfall is below the required amount to avoid the semi-arid classification.

Landmarks

The city's landmarks include: the Church of Saint Lazarus; the Catacomb of Phaneromeni Church; Hala Sultan Tekke; the Kamares Aqueduct; and the Fort of Larnaca.

So-called "Foinikoudes" is the promenade along Athenon Avenue on the seafront. A row of palm trees (Cypriot Greek:) lines either side of it.

Monuments

 A bust of Kimon the Athenian stands on the Foinikoudes Promenade, with this quote referring to him on the pedestal: "Even in death he was victorious".
 The marble bust of Zeno stands at the crossroads near the American Academy. Zeno was born in Kition in 334 BC. After studying philosophy in Athens, he founded the famous Stoic school of philosophy.
 The Armenian Genocide Memorial stands on Athinon Avenue.

Economy

Larnaca's economy has been growing since 1975, after the loss of the Port of Famagusta, which handled 80% of general cargo, and the closure of Nicosia International Airport, meant that Larnaca's airport and seaport had increasingly important roles in the economy of the island. A €650m upgrade of Larnaca Airport has been completed.

The service sector, including tourism, employs three-quarters of Larnaca's labour force. Many travel and tour operators and other travel-related companies have a head office Larnaca.

Education

There are over a hundred educational institutions in the city, including the American Academy, Larnaca Nareg Armenian school and the Alexander College.

Culture

Arts
Larnaca has a theatre and an art gallery, which are operated by the municipality. The Cornaro Institute was a cultural centre founded by the celebrated Cypriot artist Stass Paraskos in the Old Town in 2007, which staged contemporary art exhibitions and other cultural events, prior to its closure by Larnaca Municipality in 2017.

Music

Local institutions include the Municipal Wind Orchestra.

Sports
Local teams include (football:) AEK Larnaca FC and ALKI Larnaca FC.
Due to the Turkish occupation of Famagusta, the two teams of Famagusta, Anorthosis and Nea Salamina, are located here.

Local sports arenas include AEK Arena - Georgios Karapatakis, GSZ Stadium, "Antonis Papadopoulos" and "Ammochostos".

International competitions held in the city, include the Larnaka International Marathon since 2017, the Shooting Shotgun European Championships in 2012, the FIVB Beach Volleyball SWATCH Youth World Championship in 2012, the European Under-19 Football Championship final in 1998 and the European Under-17 Football Championship final in 1992.

Larnaca attracts windsurfers from around the world especially in autumn. Mackenzie Beach hosts windsurfing centre together with an extreme sports centre.

Festivals
Much of the activity is centered on the city promenade during the major festivals. The most important of these is Kataklysmos or the Festival of the Flood, celebrated in early summer with a series of cultural events. The festival used to last for about a week, but, in recent years, with the increased commercialism of peripheral stalls, rides and temporary Loukoumades restaurants, the festival has been extended to about three weeks, during which the seafront is closed to traffic in the evenings.

Museums
Museums found in Larnaca include the Larnaca District Archaeological Museum, Pierides Museum, Agios Lazaros Byzantine Museum, Kallinikeio Municipal Museum of Athienou, Larnaca Medieval Museum, Larnaca Municipal Museum of Natural History, Larnaca Municipal Historical Archives - Museum of Larnaca, Folklore Museum ‘Kostas Kaimakliotis’ - Aradippou, Theasis Museum, Kyriazis Medical Museum and Museum of Michel Platini.

Cuisine
The beaches of Larnaca are lined with nearly identical seafood restaurants catering to tourists. Although there are many continental and international restaurants in Larnaca, visitors do not miss out on indulging in the local food. Many of the staple dishes involve beans, such as fasolaki (French beans cooked in red wine with lamb), and louvi me lahana (black-eyed peas with chard).
Some of the standard appetizers are potato salad, kohlrabi salad, and hot grilled black olives.
The next course may include Cyprus village sausage and sheftalia, dolmades and keftedes, kolokassi in tomato sauce, and several aubergine-based dishes. Baked or grilled lamb (souvla) usually appears somewhere in the course of dining, as does some kind of fish.

Neighbourhoods
Larnaca's neighbourhoods include Skala, Prodromos, Faneromeni, Drosia, Kamares, Vergina and Agioi Anargyroi.

Transport

The city's transport hubs are Larnaca International Airport and Larnaca Port—the Republic's busiest airport and second busiest port.

Public transport
Public transport in Larnaca is served only by buses. Bus routes and timetables can be found here.

International relations

Twin towns – sister cities
Larnaca Municipality is twinned with the following:

  Acapulco, Mexico (since 2011)
  Ajaccio, France (since 1989)
  Bratislava, Slovakia (since 2013)
  Galaxidi, Greece (since 2005)
  Giannitsa, Greece (since 2003)
  Glyfada, Greece (since 1998)
  Ilioupoli, Greece (since 2000)
  Larissa, Greece (since 1990)
  Leros, Greece (since 2000)
  Marrickville, Australia (since 2005)
  Piraeus, Greece (since 1999)
  Poti, Georgia (since 1987)
  Sarandë, Albania (since 1994)
  Szeged, Hungary (since 1993)
  Tarpon Springs, U.S. (since 2009)
  Tianjin, China (since 2007)
  Tripoli, Lebanon
  Tulcea, Romania (since 2003)
  Venice, Italy (since 2010)

Notable residents
 Zeno of Citium (c. 334 – c. 262 BC), Stoic philosopher
 Apollonios of Kition (1st century BC), physician, nicknamed "the Cypriot Hippocrates"
 Ebubekir Pasha (1670 – 1757/1758), Governor of Larnaca and philanthropist
 Demetrios Pieridis (1811–1895), founder of the Pieridis Museum
 Dimitris Lipertis (1866–1937), national poet
 Neoclis Kyriazis (1877–1956), medical doctor and historian
 Mehmet Nazim Adil (1922–2014), leader of the Nakshbandi Sufi order (or Tekke), born in Larnaca
 Kyriacos A. Athanasiou, Cypriot-American academic, entrepreneur, and past-president of the Biomedical Engineering Society
 Stass Paraskos, artist
 Mihalis Violaris, singer and composer who helped popularise Cypriot music in Greece
 Giorgos Theofanous, composer
 Anna Vissi, singer
 Loucas Yiorkas, singer, The X Factor winner in 2009
 Ada Nicodemou, actress
 Garo Yepremian, Armenian-Cypriot former NFL placekicker, played as a member of the 1972 Miami Dolphins, to date the only team in NFL history to finish with a perfect record
 Chrystalleni Trikomiti, Commonwealth Games gold-medalist rhythmic gymnast
 Martino Tirimo, Cypriot classical pianist
 Tio Ellinas, Cypriot racing driver

Gallery

See also
 Larnaca District
 Kittim
 Chryspolitissa Orthodox Church

References

External links

 Municipality

 
Cities in ancient Cyprus
Communities in Larnaca District
Mediterranean port cities and towns in Cyprus